William "Tim" Jackson (28 October 1907 – 19 February 1975) was an Australian politician.

He was born in Dover. In 1946 he was elected to the Tasmanian House of Assembly as a Liberal member for Franklin. From 1956 to 1960 he served as Leader of the Opposition. He resigned from the Liberal Party in 1960 and sat as an Independent Liberal, losing his seat in 1964.

References

1907 births
1975 deaths
Liberal Party of Australia members of the Parliament of Tasmania
Independent members of the Parliament of Tasmania
Members of the Tasmanian House of Assembly
Leaders of the Opposition in Tasmania
20th-century Australian politicians